Andre M. Moore (born July 2, 1964), is a retired American-Australian professional basketball player. As a 6 ft 9 in (205 cm) power forward, he played in the National Basketball Association (NBA)  for both the Milwaukee Bucks and the Denver Nuggets during the 1987–88 season. He also played in Australia for the Brisbane Bullets, Cairns and Krustys.

High school
Moore played for Carver High School in Chicago, and represented the school at the 1982 Tribune-McDonald's Prep Cage Classic, where his City All-Star team lost to a Suburban All-Star team led by Kevin Duckworth. Moore led the city team with 17 points. Later that year, he was named to the Illinois All-Star team, which defeated Indiana's All-Stars in a game held in Gary, Indiana.

College
Moore attended the University of Illinois-Chicago from 1982 to 1983, but did not play for the Flames due to ineligibility. He then transferred to Loyola University Chicago where he had to again sit out the season (1983–84) due to being a transfer student. His next three seasons with the Loyola University Ramblers saw Moore play 85 games and average 16.5 points, 10.9 rebounds and 2.1 blocks per game. Loyola reached the Sweet 16 of the 1985 NCAA Men's Division I Basketball Tournament, but lost to Patrick Ewing's Georgetown University team, 65-53. Moore had 19 points in the game. In his senior year at Loyola (1986–87), Moore was the Midwestern Collegiate Conference Men's Basketball Player of the Year.

Early professional career
Moore was drafted by the Denver Nuggets in the 2nd round of the 1987 NBA Draft. In 10 games with the Nuggets and Milwaukee Bucks, he averaged 2.4 points, 1.4 rebounds and 0.6 assists per game. Afterwards, he played in Spain, France, the United States Basketball League, and the Continental Basketball Association. In the CBA, he appeared in nine games for the Tulsa Fast Breakers, who were coached by former NBA player Henry Bibby.

Australia
Moore then embarked on a career in Australia in the National Basketball League. He first signed with the Brisbane Bullets, who had recruited him while he was in the CBA, and helped them to the 1990 NBL Grand Final series against the Perth Wildcats. His teammates on Brisbane included fellow Americans Derek Rucker and Leroy Loggins. Moore's outstanding play in the NBL saw him selected to the 1990 All-NBL Team and several NBL All-Star Games. The 1990 season was arguably his strongest year, as he averaged 26.9 points, 12.6 rebounds, and two blocks per game while shooting 61.1% from the field.

After playing for the Bullets, Moore joined the Hobart Devils in 1995. He also played for the Kuiyam Pride and Cairns Marlins of the Australian Basketball Association. After his stints in the ABA he returned to the NBL to play with the Cairns Taipans from 1999 to 2001.

Recent years
Moore settled in Australia after his playing days. He has continued playing recreational basketball since his retirement, and has participated in the World Masters Games and Pan-Pacific Masters Games. He has been active in the community through his Big Feat program, promoting healthy lifestyles to school groups and other organisations.

Personal life
Moore's son Archie Smith is an Australian Rules footballer who was signed by the Brisbane Lions in 2013.

References

External links 
 College & NBA stats @ basketballreference.com

1964 births
Living people
20th-century African-American sportspeople
21st-century African-American people
African-American basketball players
American emigrants to Australia
American expatriate basketball people in Australia
American men's basketball players
Australian men's basketball players
Basketball players from Chicago
Brisbane Bullets players
Cairns Taipans players
Denver Nuggets players
Hobart Devils players
Loyola Ramblers men's basketball players
Milwaukee Bucks players
Small forwards
Tulsa Fast Breakers players